The  took place in Japan on 6 June 1181 (or by the Japanese calendar, Jishō-5 year, 4-month, 25-day), in the present-day town of Sunomata, Gifu Prefecture. The battle started when Minamoto no Yukiie attempted a sneak attack against his enemies during the night. He found Taira no Tomomori and his army directly opposite from his, along the Sunomata River, near the borders of Owari and Mino provinces.

The Minamoto warriors waded across, but their ambush failed when the Taira clan could distinguish dry friend from soaking, dripping wet foe, even in the pitch dark of night. Yukiie and a number of other surviving Minamoto were forced back across the river.

After crossing the river, the Minamoto went to the Yahagi River in Mikawa Province, but the Taira chased after them.

See also
List of Japanese battles

References

1180s in Japan
1181 in Asia
Sunomata-gawa
Sunomatagawa 1181